Edwin Blunt (21 May 1918 – 20 September 1993) was an English footballer who played for Northampton Town and Accrington Stanley either side of World War II.

Career
Blunt played for Lichfield City before joining Port Vale as an amateur in March 1937; he left The Old Recreation Ground without playing a first team game in May 1937. He moved on to Northampton Town, but returned to Vale as a wartime guest in November 1939. He scored one goal in his ten appearances and departed when the club went into abeyance in 1940. He stayed in the area and guested for Wrexham, Stoke City (scoring 7 goals in 29 games) and Crewe Alexandra, before returning to Vale in August 1944. He played six games before moving on in October 1944 to guest for Bury, Wolverhampton Wanderers and Stafford Rangers, heading back to Northampton at the war's end.

He made 87 appearances during his twelve years at Northampton, though those years did span the entire war, limiting his opportunities to play drastically. He helped the "Cobblers" to finish 13th in the Third Division South in 1946–47, and then 14th in 1947–48 and 20th in 1948–49. He then departed the County Ground and moved on to Accrington Stanley. He scored once in nine Third Division North games in 1949–50, and then left Peel Park and retired from professional football. He later represented Northwich Victoria and Congleton Town, before joining Cheshire County League side Macclesfield Town. He made his debut for the "Silkmen" against Buxton at Moss Rose on 13 August 1951. He went on to make a total of 12 league and FA Cup appearances for the club, scoring one goal.

Career statistics
Source:

References

1918 births
1993 deaths
Footballers from Stoke-on-Trent
English footballers
Association football midfielders
Association football forwards
Lichfield City F.C. players
Port Vale F.C. players
Northampton Town F.C. players
Wrexham F.C. wartime guest players
Stoke City F.C. wartime guest players
Crewe Alexandra F.C. wartime guest players
Port Vale F.C. wartime guest players
Bury F.C. wartime guest players
Wolverhampton Wanderers F.C. wartime guest players
Stafford Rangers F.C. wartime guest players
Accrington Stanley F.C. (1891) players
Northwich Victoria F.C. players
Congleton Town F.C. players
Macclesfield Town F.C. players
English Football League players